The 71st Intelligence, Surveillance, and Reconnaissance Squadron (71 ISRS) is a United States Space Force unit assigned to Space Operations Command's Space Delta 7. It provides intelligence support to all deltas in the Space Force through its six detachments. Headquartered at Peterson Space Force Base, Colorado, it was activated on 11 September 2020.

List of commanders 

 Lt Col Michelle Saffold, 24 June 2022 - Present
 Maj Michael Harter, 11 September 2020 - 23 June 2022

See also 
 Space Delta 7

References

External links 
 

Military education and training in the United States
Squadrons of the United States Space Force